Fahrettin Koca (born 2 January 1965) is a Turkish physician and politician. He is the minister of health of the 66th government of Turkey.

Early life and education
Fahrettin Koca was born on 2 January 1965 in the village Ömeranlı of Konya's Kulu district. He completed his primary and secondary education in Konya and high school in Bursa. After graduating from Istanbul University Medical School in 1988, he received the title of medical doctor. He completed his specialization in the Department of Child Health and Diseases at the Istanbul University Cerrahpaşa Medical School.

Career
Koca became a pediatrician in 1995. He worked as a doctor and medical director in various health institutions.

He was the Chairman of the Board of Trustees of Istanbul Medipol University, which was founded in 2009 by the Education Health and Research Foundation (TESA), of which he was the founding president. He is a member of the Turkish Pediatrics Institution, the Pediatric Metabolism and Nutrition Association and the Private Hospitals Health Institutions Association (OHSAD). He is also the vice president of the Business Council of the Foreign Economic Relations Council (DEİK) Education Committee and the president of the University Hospitals Association.

Political career
After the 2018 general elections held in accordance with the amendments from the 2017 Turkish constitutional referendum, Koca was appointed as the minister of health by President Recep Tayyip Erdoğan. He took office on 10 July 2018.

References

1965 births
Turkish pediatricians
Health ministers of Turkey
Living people
People from Konya
Istanbul University Faculty of Medicine alumni
Istanbul University Cerrahpaşa Faculty of Medicine alumni
Members of the 66th government of Turkey